Southland Mall is an enclosed shopping mall located in Houma, Louisiana, at the intersection of Bayou Gardens Boulevard and West Park Avenue.  It was remodeled in 2006. The mall had required a curfew in 1996 because of teens fighting.  In 1998, the mall added a Santa fixture.  The movie theater closed in 2007.  Scooters were used for security in 2010.  During the summer of 2016, the Sears, which opened in 1966, closed after poor sales, as well as other Sears stores across the U.S. Anchor stores are Dillard's and JCPenney.

References

External links
Southland Mall official website

Shopping malls in Louisiana
Houma, Louisiana
Buildings and structures in Terrebonne Parish, Louisiana
Tourist attractions in Terrebonne Parish, Louisiana
Shopping malls established in 1969